"Tumbling Tumbleweeds" is a song composed by Bob Nolan. Although one of the most famous songs associated with the Sons of the Pioneers, the song was composed by Nolan in the 1930s, while working as a caddy and living in Los Angeles. Originally titled "Tumbling Leaves," the song was reworked into the title "Tumbling Tumbleweeds" and into fame with the 1935 Gene Autry film of the same name. Members of the Western Writers of America chose it as one of the Top 100 Western songs of all time.

Cover versions
 The Sons of the Pioneers first recorded the song for Decca on August 8, 1934 and it enjoyed chart success that year. Their 1934 recording was selected by the Library of Congress as a 2010 addition to the National Recording Registry, which selects recordings annually that are "culturally, historically, or aesthetically significant". Their 1946 version of the song was featured in the 1998 film The Big Lebowski, though it did not appear on the soundtrack release. 
 Gene Autry recorded his version on January 11, 1935 at ARC Studios, New York City.
 Bing Crosby recorded the song with John Scott Trotter's Orchestra in Los Angeles 9 February 1940.  This version reached the No. 12 position in the charts of the day during a 7-week stay. Crosby recorded the song again in 1954 for his album Bing: A Musical Autobiography.
 Kate Smith recorded the song on June 1, 1945 for Columbia (36871) and it is available on her CD 16 Most Requested Songs.
 Slim Whitman had a top twenty hit in the UK with "Tumbling Tumbleweeds" in 1956.
 Roger Williams (pianist) recorded his version of "Tumbling Tumbleweeds" that reached #60 in US in 1956.
 Pat Boone recorded a version of "Tumbling Tumbleweeds" with his wife Shirley Boone on their 1959 album "Side by Side".
 Johnnie Ray recorded his version for the 1959 album On the Trail.
 Jazz guitarist Grant Green recorded a version in 1962, which was released on the 1969 album Goin' West, and features Herbie Hancock on piano.
 Film actor Clint Eastwood recorded a version on his 1962 album Cowboy Favorites.
 Frankie Laine recorded a version on his 1962 album Call of the Wild.
 Lorne Greene recorded the song for his 1965 album American West.
 The Supremes covered the song on their 1965 album The Supremes Sing Country, Western & Pop, although it was recorded two years earlier. Diana Ross sings lead.
 Harry James recorded a version on his 1966 album Harry James & His Western Friends (Dot DLP 3735 and DLP 25735).
 In the song "Turn on, Tune in, Drop Out" by The Fugs on their 1968 album Tenderness Junction, the chorus of "Tumbling Tumbleweeds" is sung over part of the instrumental section.
 Don Everly recorded a version in 1970. It is the opening track on the album Don Everly.
Michael Nesmith covered the song with his band The First National Band on their album Nevada Fighter, released in 1971.
 Marty Robbins recorded a version on his 1979 album All Around Cowboy.
 Leo Kottke recorded a version on his 1981 album Guitar Music.
 Meat Puppets recorded a cover on their 1982 self-titled debut album.
Michael Martin Murphey recorded a version on his 1990 album Cowboy Songs.
Element of Crime released a version of on their 1996 album Die schönen Rosen.

Film appearances
 1935 – Tumbling Tumbleweeds
 1943 – Silver Spurs – Performed by Roy Rogers and the Sons of the Pioneers
 1944 – Hollywood Canteen – Sung by Sons of the Pioneers
 1945 – Don't Fence Me In – Sung by Roy Rogers, Dale Evans and the Sons of the Pioneers
 1978 – Happy Days - Sung by Anson Williams at the end of part three of "Westward Ho" 
 1982 – M*A*S*H "Pressure Points"
 1991 – City Slickers
 1998 – The Big Lebowski
 2000 – Two of Us
 2020 – Nomadland

References

External links
 Tumbling Tumbleweeds - The Luck and the Loss  Video produced by the PBS Series History Detectives

1934 singles
1935 singles
Western music (North America)
Sons of the Pioneers songs
Gene Autry songs
Johnnie Ray songs
Meat Puppets songs
Burl Ives songs
Slim Whitman songs
Songs written by Bob Nolan
United States National Recording Registry recordings